The following is a timeline of the history of the city of Erbil, Kurdistan Region.

Prior to 20th century
 1232 - Mudhafaria Minaret built.
 1870 - Mustafa Agha became first Director Municipality of Erbil .
 1883 - Sheikh Choli Mosque built .

20th century
 1918 – Erbil occupied by British forces on November
 1923 - Ahmed Othman became first Governor of Erbil.
 1930 - Erbil al-Aulla School established .
 1943 - Library of Erbil established .
 1966 - 7 September: Erbil Chamber of Commerce founded .
 1968 
 Gilkand Park established 
 	3 November: Erbil SC (football club) formed .
 1981 - Salahaddin University moved to Erbil from Sulaymaniyah .
 1991 - 11 March: People in the Erbil attacked the Iraqi military bases and stormed government buildings and took control of the City and inflicted heavy damage on government forces
 1992 - City becomes capital of the Kurdistan Region
 1996
 Erbil Polytechnic University founded.
 31 August: City occupied by forces of Iraqi Republican Guard.

21st century
	
 2001 - Politician Franso Hariri assassinated .
 2004 
 1 February: Bombings .
 Kurdish Textile Museum established .
 2005 
 Hawler Medical University founded .
 4 May : bombing.
 7 July: Erbil International Airport opens .
 2006 - University of Kurdistan Hewler established .
 2007 
 Jalil Khayat Mosque built.
 9 May: Bombing.
 2013 - 29 September: Bombings.
 2014 - 19 November: Bombing.
 2015 - 17 April: Car Bomb Explodes Outside US Consulate.
 2017 - 29 October: Protesters storm Iraqi Kurdistan parliament after Barzani announces resignation
 2018 
 23 July:  Erbil governorate building attack by unknown Gunmen .
 4 August: Fire destroys Qaysari Bazaar .
 25 October: Fire destroys Second-hand shops .
 2020 - 30 September: Erbil International Airport rocket attacks
 2021 
 Illusion Museum established 
15 February: Erbil rocket attacks .
 24 February : Armenian Cultural Center opens.
 14 April: Erbil International Airport attacks by drones.
 25 June : Fire destroys Hawler Mall .
 6 July: Erbil International Airport attacks by drones.
 2022
 28 June: Two university professors killed in shooting in  Erbil.

References

Years in Iraq
Erbil
Erbil
Iraqi Kurdistan
History of Erbil